André-Nicolas Levasseur (also known as Auguste Levasseur) was a 19th-century French writer and diplomat known in the United States for accompanying the Marquis de La Fayette during his last trip to the Americas and in the Caribbean and Mexico for his involvement in French imperialism.

Lafayette's secretary

Levasseur is better known in the English-speaking world as the personal secretary of Gilbert du Motier, Marquis de Lafayette, during his last visit to the United States, from July 1824 to September 1825.

In 1829, he published his travel's notes and memoirs in two volumes with the title of Lafayette en Amérique, en 1824 et 1825 ou Journal d'un voyage aux États-Unis. That same year, one translation appeared in German and two in English (New York City and Philadelphia). A fourth translation, this time in Dutch, was published in 1831. Since then, Levasseur's work has been an important source of information to historians. It continues to be cited as an important primary source; particularly as an account's witness of the events surrounding Lafayette's celebrated visit.

French diplomat to Haiti and Mexico
After gaining prominence through the publication of Lafayette's memories (or travel log) Levasseur became active in the French international arena. In 1838 he was appointed as consul to Haiti with the tasks of ensuring the indemnity payment that President Jean-Pierre Boyer had agreed in 1825 and of bringing the young Black Republic closer to a protectorate with France.

In 1843, while Haiti struggled between new reform liberal forces and the independence movement in the east, Levasseur involved himself in the internal politics by suggesting to Dominican leaders the idea of becoming a protectorate of France. France would supply money, arms and protection with the condition of giving up Samaná Bay and allowing France to appoint a governor. This plan did not work, and Levasseur is seen today as an example of unwelcome imperial intervention in the postcolonial world for Haitian and Dominican authors alike.

Not long after failing as a diplomat in Haiti, Levasseur was appointed again to another French imperial intervention in the Americas: the case of Mexico.

References

Sources

External links 

 Works by Auguste Levasseur at Project Gutenberg

French people of the American Revolution
1820s in the United States
History of the Dominican Republic
History of Haiti
History of Mexico
19th-century French people